The 2021 Durham County Council election was held on 6 May 2021 as part of the 2021 local elections in the United Kingdom.

All 126 councillors were to be elected. The county is divided into 63 electoral divisions (called "wards") with each electing between 1 and 3 councillors by the first-past-the-post voting method for a fixed four-year term.

The result saw the Labour Party retain its position as the largest party but lose control of the council. It marked the first time since 1919 that the council (and its predecessors) had not been controlled by Labour.

The council convened in its Annual Meeting on 26 May, where a coalition of the Conservatives, Liberal Democrats, North East Party, and independents formed the Cabinet and elected Amanda Hopgood of the Liberal Democrats as Leader of the Council; the first woman to hold the position.

Results summary

|-
|
| Seaham Community Party
| align="right" |0
| align="right" |0
| align="right" |0
| align="right" |-
| align="right" |0.0
| align="right" |1.1
| align="right" |3,091
| align="right" |-0.2
|-
|-
|
| Political Unity for Progress
| align="right" |0
| align="right" |0
| align="right" |0
| align="right" |-
| align="right" |0.0
| align="right" |0.6
| align="right" |1,512
| align="right" |+0.6
|-

|-
|
| Spennymoor Independents
| align="right" |0
| align="right" |0
| align="right" |5
| align="right" |-5
| align="right" |0.0
| align="right" |0.0
| align="right" |0
| align="right" |-1.6
|-

|}

Results by electoral division

A − B

C − D

E − N

P − S

T − W

By-elections

Ferryhill 
The by-election was triggered by the death of Independent Cllr Brian Avery in October 2021, who represented the ward since the 2013 elections, having been previously elected to represent Chilton as a Labour candidate in 2008.

 

 

 

 

Conservative candidate David Farry last contested the ward as an Independent candidate in 2017, having previously been elected a councillor for the ward in 2008 but defeated in 2013 as a F.A.I.R. candidate. Independent Joe Makepeace represented the ward from 2017 until 2021, when he failed to be re-elected to his seat.

West Auckland

References

Durham County Council elections
Durham
2020s in County Durham